Kim Hyo-Il (born 7 September 1979) is a South Korean football midfielder who plays for Chungju Hummel in the K League Classic as a player-coach. Kim often plays as a defensive midfielder, but also as an attacking midfielder and right winger.

Club career

South Korea
In 2003, Kim signed with the Chunnam Dragons, a club based in the Korean city of Gwangyang that plays in the K-League. He transferred to Gyeongnam FC in the 2007 K-League season, and went on to play for the club until 2008. Kim has also played for Korean-based football clubs Busan I'Park and Ulsan Hyundai Mipo Dockyard.

Philippines
In 2012, Kim signed with the Loyola Meralco Sparks to play in the first division of the United Football League. He transferred to Stallion FC for the 2012–13 United Football Cup, and made his debut in a 6–0 win against Sta. Lucia FC.

Club statistics

Honours

Club
Stallion
UFL Division 1: 2013
UFL Cup: 2012

References

External links
 

1979 births
Living people
Association football midfielders
South Korean footballers
Jeonnam Dragons players
Gyeongnam FC players
Busan IPark players
Chungju Hummel FC players
K League 1 players
K League 2 players
Korea National League players
F.C. Meralco Manila players
Stallion Laguna F.C. players
South Korean expatriate footballers
South Korean expatriate sportspeople in the Philippines
Expatriate footballers in the Philippines
Gyeongsang National University alumni